Anupam Gupta is a senior lawyer in the Punjab and Haryana High Court, Chandigarh, India. Most notably, he has been the  lawyer of the Liberhan Commission on the destruction of the Babri Masjid on 6 December 1992.

Education
Anupam Gupta did his matriculation from Government Senior Model School, Sector 16, Chandigarh.

Career

Liberhan Commission

References

20th-century Indian lawyers
Scholars from Chandigarh
1956 births
Living people